Barbianello (Lombard: Barbiané) is a comune (municipality) in the Province of Pavia in the Italian region Lombardy, located about 45 km south of Milan and about 14 km southeast of Pavia.

Barbianello borders the following municipalities: Albaredo Arnaboldi, Broni, Campospinoso, Casanova Lonati, Pinarolo Po, Redavalle, Santa Giuletta.

References

External links 
 

Cities and towns in Lombardy